Grant Morgan is a political activist from Auckland, New Zealand.

Morgan was a leading member of the now defunct Socialist Worker, and the chairperson of the (also defunct) Residents Action Movement. He was also the first Secretary of the Solidarity Union, and the last General Secretary of the Communist Party of New Zealand.

References 

New Zealand left-wing activists
Living people
Residents Action Movement politicians
New Zealand communists
Year of birth missing (living people)